Malgachinsula maisongrossalis is a species of snout moth in the genus Malgachinsula. It was described by Viette in 1953, and is known from Madagascar (including Maroantsetra, the type location).

References

Moths described in 1953
Phycitinae
Moths of Madagascar
Moths of Africa